Lincoln Township is one of sixteen townships in Calhoun County, Iowa, United States.  As of the 2000 census, its population was 2,150.

History
Lincoln Township was created in 1866. It was named in honor of Abraham Lincoln, who had been assassinated the year before.

Geography
According to the USGS, it contains four cemeteries: Hope, Rose Hill, Saint Thomas and Trinity.

References

External links
 City-Data.com

Townships in Calhoun County, Iowa
Townships in Iowa